is an interchange passenger railway station located in the city of Akishima, Tokyo, Japan, jointly operated by East Japan Railway Company (JR East) and the private railway operator Seibu Railway. The station is also a freight depot for the Japan Freight Railway Company (JR Freight).

Lines
Haijima is a station stop for the Ōme Liner. It is 6.9 kilometers from the start of the Ōme Line at Tachikawa.

It is 9.9 kilometers from Hachiōji Station.

Haijima is a terminus of the Seibu Haijima Line, with services running from  via the Seibu Shinjuku Line.

The station also has an industrial line to Yokota Air Base for supplying fuels to the base.

Station layout

The JR East side of the station consists of one side platform and two island platforms serving a total of five tracks. The station building is elevated and is above the tracks and platforms. the station has a "Midori no Madoguchi" staffed ticket office.

The Seibu side of the station consists of one island platform serving two tracks.

Platforms

Low-cost platform edge doors consisting of three bars that are raised and lowered were installed along part of platform 5 on an experimental basis in March 2015.

History
The station opened on 19 November 1894. The Seibu station opened on 15 May 1968.

The southern section of the Hachikō Line between Hachiōji and Komagawa was electrified on 16 March 1996, with through services commencing between Hachiōji and Kawagoe.

Station numbering was introduced on all Seibu Railway lines during fiscal 2012, with Haijima Station becoming "SS36".

Passenger statistics
In fiscal 2019, the JR portion the station was used by an average of 29,946 passengers daily (boarding passengers only).  In the same fiscal year, the station was the 26th busiest on the Seibu network with an average of 36,317 passengers daily.

The passenger figures in previous years are as shown below. Note that the JR East figures only consider boarding passengers whereas the Seibu figures consider both entering and exiting passengers.

Surrounding area
 Haijima Daishi Temple

References

External links

 JR East station information 
 Seibu station information 

Railway stations in Tokyo
Railway stations in Japan opened in 1894
Hachikō Line
Itsukaichi Line
Ōme Line
Stations of East Japan Railway Company
Stations of Japan Freight Railway Company
Stations of Seibu Railway
Akishima, Tokyo